My Life Is Murder is an Australian and New Zealand murder mystery, crime comedy-drama television series, broadcast on Network 10 and TVNZ 1. The ten part series premiered on 17 July 2019, at 8:40 pm. In the United States, the series began streaming on Acorn TV on 5 August 2019 and in the United Kingdom, to Alibi on 24 September 2019.

By the end of October 2020, the series had been renewed for a second 10-episode season, with TVNZ, Network 10, Acorn and other networks signed on to broadcast. The second season premiered August 9, 2021 on TVNZ 1, and began streaming in North America on Acorn on August 30, 2021. In February 2022, the series was renewed for a third 10-episode season by Acorn.

Synopsis
My Life Is Murder follows the adventures of fearless private investigator Alexa Crowe, who solves the most baffling crimes as well as coping with the frustrations of everyday life.

Cast

Main
 Lucy Lawless as PI Alexa Crowe, former investigator of Melbourne PD. As a side hustle, she bakes bread in her kitchen for Baristas Café. From the second season, she moved to Auckland to be closer to her brother, Will. She also starts bread deliveries to Reuben's. 
 Ebony Vagulans as Madison Feliciano, Alexa's assistant. She's a former hacker and enrolled into the scientific police to avoid being arrested. 
 Bernard Curry as DI Kieran Hussey (Season 1; guest Season 2), investigator for the Melbourne PD whom Crowe consults for. 
 Rawiri Jobe as Detective Harry Henare (Season 2—), a friend of Kieran who gives cases to Crowe. 
 Alex Andreas as George Stathopoulos (Season 1), owner of the Baristas Café. 
 Joe Naufahu as Reuben Wulf (Season 2—), owner of the Reuben's.

Recurring
 Dilruk Jayasinha as Dr. Suresh (Season 1)
 Kate McCartney as Dawn Mason (Season 1), Alexa's landlady and neighbour
 Martin Henderson as Will Crowe (Seasons 2 and 3), Alexa's brother
 Todd River as Captain Thunderbolt, Alexa's pet cat (Season 1)
 Zeppelin as Chowder, Alexa's pet cat (Seasons 2 and 3)
 Tatum Warren-Ngata as Beth, a Navy Cryptologist and Madison's gamer friend (Season 3)
 Steffen Schweizer as Gerhardt (Season 1)
 Laura Daniel as Isla (Season 2)
 Nell Fisher as Olive Crowe (Season 3). Alexa's niece and Will's daughter

Notable guests

Episodes

Series overview

Season 1 (2019)

Season 2 (2021)

Season 3 (2022)

Home Media

References

External links
 
 Acorn TV
 

2010s New Zealand television series
2019 Australian television series debuts
2019 New Zealand television series debuts
Australian comedy-drama television series
Australian mystery television series
English-language television shows
Network 10 original programming
New Zealand comedy-drama television series
New Zealand mystery television series
Television shows filmed in New Zealand
Television shows set in Auckland
Television shows set in Melbourne
Television series by Greenstone TV
TVNZ 1 original programming